The following is an alphabetical list of articles related to the U.S. state of Delaware.

0–9 

.de.us – Internet second-level domain for the state of Delaware
1st state to ratify the Constitution of the United States of America
2020 coronavirus pandemic in Delaware

A
Adjacent states:

Agriculture in Delaware
Airports in Delaware
Archaeology in Delaware
Architecture in Delaware
Area codes in Delaware
Art museums and galleries in Delaware
commons:Category:Art museums and galleries in Delaware
Astronomical observatories in Delaware
commons:Category:Astronomical observatories in Delaware
Attorney General of the State of Delaware

B
Botanical gardens in Delaware
commons:Category:Botanical gardens in Delaware
Buildings and structures in Delaware
commons:Category:Buildings and structures in Delaware

C

Caesar Rodney Institute
Capital of the State of Delaware
Capitol of the State of Delaware
commons:Category:Delaware State Capitol
Casinos in Delaware
Census statistical areas of Delaware
Cities in Delaware
commons:Category:Cities in Delaware
Delaware Wing Civil Air Patrol
Climate of Delaware
Climate change in Delaware 
Colony of Delaware – see Lower Counties on the Delaware River
Colony of New-York, (1664–1673), (1674–1681)-1688, and 1689–1776
Colony of Pennsylvania, 1681–1776
Colleges and universities in Delaware
commons:Category:Universities and colleges in Delaware
Committee of 100 (Delaware)
Communications in Delaware
commons:Category:Communications in Delaware

Companies in Delaware
:Category:Companies based in Delaware
Congressional districts of Delaware
Corporations incorporated in Delaware
Constitution of the State of Delaware
Counties of the State of Delaware
commons:Category:Counties in Delaware
New Castle County, Delaware
Kent County, Delaware
Sussex County, Delaware
Culture of Delaware
commons:Category:Delaware culture

D
DE – United States Postal Service postal code for the state of Delaware
Delaware  website
:Category:Delaware
commons:Category:Delaware
commons:Category:Maps of Delaware
Delaware Academy of Medicine
Delaware Colony
Delaware corporation
Delaware County in six states
The Delaware Journal of Corporate Law
Delaware Depository
Delaware General Assembly Delegations from New Castle County
Delaware Intercorp
Delaware River
Delaware State Police
Delaware Student Testing Program
Delaware Township in seven states
Delaware Valley
Delaware Volunteer Firemen's Association
Demographics of Delaware
Dover, Delaware, state capital since 1777

E
Economy of Delaware
:Category:Economy of Delaware
commons:Category:Economy of Delaware
Education in Delaware
:Category:Education in Delaware
commons:Category:Education in Delaware
Elections in the state of Delaware
:Category:Delaware elections
commons:Category:Delaware elections
Environment of Delaware
commons:Category:Environment of Delaware

F

Fenwick Island
Festivals in Delaware
commons:Category:Festivals in Delaware
First State
Fishing in Delaware
Flag of the state of Delaware
Forts in Delaware
Fort Casimir
Fort Christina, capital of Swedish colony of Nya Sverige 1638-1655
Fort Delaware
Fort du Pont
Fort Miles
:Category:Forts in Delaware
commons:Category:Forts in Delaware

G

Geography of Delaware
:Category:Geography of Delaware
commons:Category:Geography of Delaware
Geology of Delaware
:Category:Geology of Delaware
commons:Category:Geology of Delaware
commons:Category:Geography of Delaware
Ghost towns in Delaware
:Category:Ghost towns in Delaware
commons:Category:Ghost towns in Delaware
Golf clubs and courses in Delaware
Government of the State of Delaware  website
:Category:Government of Delaware
commons:Category:Government of Delaware
Governor of the State of Delaware
List of governors of Delaware
Great Seal of the State of Delaware

H
Heritage railroads in Delaware
commons:Category:Heritage railroads in Delaware
High schools of Delaware
Higher education in Delaware
Highway routes in Delaware
Hiking trails in Delaware
commons:Category:Hiking trails in Delaware
History of Delaware
Historical outline of Delaware
:Category:History of Delaware
commons:Category:History of Delaware
Hospitals in Delaware
House of Representatives of the State of Delaware

I
Images of Delaware
commons:Category:Delaware
Islam in Delaware
Islands of Delaware

J

K
Kalmar Nyckel

L
Landmarks in Delaware
commons:Category:Landmarks in Delaware
Languages of Delaware
Lieutenant Governor of the State of Delaware
Lists related to the state of Delaware:
List of airports in Delaware
List of census statistical areas in Delaware
List of cities in Delaware
List of colleges and universities in Delaware
List of companies in Delaware
List of United States congressional districts in Delaware
List of counties in Delaware
List of Delaware Hundreds
List of forts in Delaware
List of ghost towns in Delaware
List of governors of Delaware
List of high schools in Delaware
List of highway routes in Delaware
List of hospitals in Delaware
List of individuals executed in Delaware
List of islands of Delaware
List of law enforcement agencies in Delaware
List of lieutenant governors of Delaware
List of municipalities of Delaware
List of museums in Delaware
List of National Historic Landmarks in Delaware
List of newspapers in Delaware
List of people from Delaware
List of places in Delaware
List of radio stations in Delaware
List of railroads in Delaware
List of Registered Historic Places in Delaware
List of rivers of Delaware
List of school districts in Delaware
List of state forests in Delaware
List of state parks in Delaware
List of state prisons in Delaware
List of state symbols of Delaware
List of telephone area codes in Delaware
List of television stations in Delaware
List of United States congressional delegations from Delaware
List of United States congressional district of Delaware
List of United States representatives from Delaware
List of United States senators from Delaware
Lower Counties on the Delaware River, 1704–1776

M
Maps of Delaware
commons:Category:Maps of Delaware
Middle Run Valley Natural Area
Museums in Delaware
:Category:Museums in Delaware
commons:Category:Museums in Delaware
Music of Delaware
:Category:Music of Delaware
commons:Category:Music of Delaware
:Category:Musical groups from Delaware
:Category:Musicians from Delaware

N
Natural history of Delaware
commons:Category:Natural history of Delaware
News media in Delaware
New-Castle, capital of the Lower Counties on the Delaware 1704–1776, first state capital 1776-1777
Newspapers of Delaware
Nieuw-Nederland, 1614–(1655–1664) and (1673–1674)
Notable people from Delaware
Nya Sverige, 1638–1655

O

P
People from Delaware
:Category:People from Delaware
commons:Category:People from Delaware
:Category:People by city in Delaware
:Category:People by county in Delaware
:Category:People from Delaware by occupation
Philadelphia-Camden-Vineland, PA-NJ-DE-MD Combined Statistical Area
Philadelphia-Camden-Wilmington, PA-NJ-DE-MD Metropolitan Statistical Area
Places in Delaware
Politics of Delaware
:Category:Politics of Delaware
commons:Category:Politics of Delaware
Protected areas of Delaware
commons:Category:Protected areas of Delaware

Q

R
Radio stations in Delaware
Railroads in Delaware
Registered historic places in Delaware
commons:Category:Registered Historic Places in Delaware
Religion in Delaware
:Category:Religion in Delaware
Rivers of Delaware
commons:Category:Rivers of Delaware

S
School districts of Delaware
Scouting in Delaware
Senate of the State of Delaware
Settlements in Delaware
Cities in Delaware
Towns in Delaware
Villages in Delaware
Census Designated Places in Delaware
Other unincorporated communities in Delaware
List of ghost towns in Delaware
List of places in Delaware
Sports in Delaware
:Category:Sports in Delaware
commons:Category:Sports in Delaware
:Category:Sports venues in Delaware
commons:Category:Sports venues in Delaware
State Capitol of Delaware
State of Delaware  website
Constitution of the State of Delaware
Government of the State of Delaware
:Category:Government of Delaware
commons:Category:Government of Delaware
Executive branch of the government of the State of Delaware
Governor of the State of Delaware
Legislative branch of the government of the State of Delaware
Legislature of the State of Delaware
Senate of the State of Delaware
House of Representatives of the State of Delaware
Judicial branch of the government of the State of Delaware
Supreme Court of the State of Delaware
State parks of Delaware
commons:Category:State parks of Delaware
State Police of Delaware
State prisons of Delaware
Structures in Delaware
Supreme Court of the State of Delaware
Symbols of the State of Delaware
:Category:Symbols of Delaware
commons:Category:Symbols of Delaware

T
Telecommunications in Delaware
commons:Category:Communications in Delaware
Telephone area codes in Delaware
Television stations in Delaware
Tourism in Delaware  website
commons:Category:Tourism in Delaware
Transportation in Delaware
:Category:Transportation in Delaware
commons:Category:Transport in Delaware

U
United States of America
States of the United States of America
United States census statistical areas of Delaware
United States congressional delegations from Delaware
United States congressional district of Delaware
United States Court of Appeals for the Third Circuit
United States District Court for the District of Delaware
United States representatives from Delaware
United States senators from Delaware
Universities and colleges in Delaware
commons:Category:Universities and colleges in Delaware
US-DE – ISO 3166-2:US region code for the State of Delaware

V

W
White Clay Creek State Park
Wikimedia
Wikimedia Commons:Category:Delaware
commons:Category:Maps of Delaware
Wikinews:Category:Delaware
Wikinews:Portal:Delaware
Wikipedia Category:Delaware
Wikipedia:WikiProject Delaware
:Category:WikiProject Delaware articles
:Category:WikiProject Delaware participants
Wilmington, Delaware
Winterthur Museum

X

Y

Z

See also

Topic overview:
Delaware
Outline of Delaware

Delaware
 
Delaware